Frizzellburg is an unincorporated community in Carroll County, Maryland, United States.

This town grew up around the blacksmith's shop, inn, and general store of Nimrod Frizell in the early 1800s.

References

Unincorporated communities in Carroll County, Maryland
Unincorporated communities in Maryland